Göran Edman (born 28 April 1956) is a Swedish vocalist.

Biography
Edman is notable for his session work with many artists through the years but mainly for his early work with guitarist Yngwie Malmsteen. He has also recorded with bands and artists such as Vindictiv, Brazen Abbot, John Norum, Madison, Karmakanic, Street Talk, Kharma, Crossfade (EU), Signum Regis and Richard Andersson among others.

Discography

Madison
Diamond Mistress (1984)
Best in Show (1986)

John Norum
Total Control (1987)
Live in Stockholm (1990)

Yngwie Malmsteen
Eclipse (1990)
Fire and Ice (1992)

Glory
Positive Buoyant (1993)
Crisis vs. Crisis (1994)
Wintergreen (1998)

Brazen Abbot
Live and Learn (1995)
Eye of the Storm (1996)
Bad Religion (1997)
Guilty as Sin (2003)
My Resurrection (2005)

Street Talk
Collaboration (1997)
Transition (2000)
Restoration (2002)
Destination (2004)
V (2006)

Snake Charmer
Backyard Boogaloo (1998–2003)

Johansson
The Last Viking (1999)

Reingold
Universe (1999)

Kharma
Wonderland (2000)

Nikolo Kotzev
Nikolo Kotzev's Nostradamus (2001)

Benny Jansson
Save the World (2002)

Karmakanic
Entering the Spectra (2002)
Wheel of Life (2004)
Who's The Boss in the Factory? (2008)
The Power of Two – Karmakanic & Agents of Mercy Live USA (2010)
In a Perfect World (2011)
 Live in the US (2014)

Crossfade (EU)
White on Blue (2004)
Secret Love (2011)

XsavioR
Caleidoscope (2005)

Richard Andersson
Ultimate Andersson Collection (2005)

Time Requiem
Optical Illusion (2006)

Corin & Edman
Roc De Light (2006)

Jayce Landberg
Lost Without You (Demo EP) (2007)
Break the Spell (2008)
Good Sleepless Night (2010)
Promise of Asgaard (EP) (2013)
The Thorns (Single) (2014)
The Forbidden World (Expected in 2015)

Vindictiv
Vindictiv (2008)
Ground Zero (2009)

Signum Regis
Signum Regis (2008)
The Eyes of Power (2010)
Exodus (2013)
 The Reckoning chap 4 (2015)

GEFF
Land of the Free (2009)

Stratosphere
Fire Flight (2010)

Docker's Guild
The Mystic Technocracy – Season 1: The Age of Ignorance (2012)

Mårran
Mårran (2012)
Vid liv EP (2012)
Mårran 2 (2012)
3/4 (2013)

Covered Call
Impact (2013)

Headless
Growing Apart (2013)
Melt The Ice Away (2016)

The Senior Management
 Heart & Soul (2018)

Guest appearances
Flintstens Med Stanley – Stenhårda Låtar 1 (1995)
Talisman – Best of Talisman|Best of... (1996)
Thomas Larsson – Freeride  (1996)
VV.AA. – Power from the North (2000)
AOR – L.A. Reflection (2002)
Talisman – Talisman (reissue) (2003)
Minstrel Spirit – Enter the Woods (2004)
Swedish Erotica – Too Daze Gone (2005)
Vitalij Kuprij – Revenge (2005)
Gutter Sirens – Horror Makers (2006) 
 (This video was made to raise funds to help the victims of 2004 tsunami disaster; the DVD features an All Star band of Scandinavian musicians, consisting of Edman as one of the main singers, Tommy Denander, Kee Marcello, Mikkey Dee, John Levén, Yngwie Malmsteen, Tommy Nilsson, Jim Jidhed, Geir Rönning, Mattias Eklundh, Thomas Vikstrom, Peter Tätgren, Stefan Andersson, Mats Levén and many others.)
Voices of Rock – MMVII  (2007)
Crash The System – The Crowning (2009)
Arthur Falcone' Stargazer – The Genesis of the Prophecy (2009)
David Mark Pearce – Strange Ang3ls (2011)
Iron Mask – Black as Death (2011)
Nergard – Memorial for a Wish (2013)
The Theander Expression – Strange Nostalgia (2013)
AOR – The Secrets of L.A. (2013)
Mägo de Oz – Find your Love (2013)
Stamina – Perseverance (2014)
Refurbished – Only Want The Best (2014)
Paco Ventura Black Moon – Get Over it Forever  (2015)
CLAIRVOYANT – "The Last Marks of Prophecy" (2016)
Roxx – "Lynze" (2019)
Luca Sellitto – "The Voice Within" (2019)

Background Vocals
Swedish Metal AID – Give A Helpin' Hand (1985)
Von Rosen – Like a dream (single)(1988)
Glory – Danger in This Game  (1989)
Alien – Shiftin' Gear (1990)
Fortune – Calling Spirits (1992)
Lion's Share – Entrance (2001)
Little Chris – At Last (2002)
AOR – Dreaming of L.A. (2003)
Ignition – Ignition (2003)
Heed – The Call (2005)
The Poodles – Sweet Trade  (2007)
Silent Call – Creations From A Chosen Path  (2008)

References

External links
 Official website
 MySpace fan page

Swedish heavy metal singers
Swedish male singers
Living people
Talisman (band) members
1956 births
The Tangent members
Iron Mask (band) members
Yngwie J. Malmsteen's Rising Force members
Brazen Abbot members
Swedish Erotica members